Kim Cloutier (born  March 25, 1987) is a Canadian-American underwear and fashion model, known for numerous lingerie, swimsuit and cosmetics campaigns.

Career 
Cloutier has appeared in the 2009 Sports Illustrated Swimsuit Edition. In the same year, she appeared on the cover of, and in an editorial in, the November issue of Details Magazine with Adam Lambert. She has also appeared in the 2014 The Cobbler with Adam Sandler.

She has appeared on the cover of Flares summer 2007 issue (Canada), in multiple spreads and features for international websites in Croatia, France, and Vietnam.

She has also appeared in Elle Accessories (Canada), Glow Magazine (Canada) and Sirene (Denmark).

Since 2010, Cloutier appeared in commercials for Soma Intimates.

She has also appeared in eight episodes of the Canadian television program Letterkenny as Anik, a Quebecoise woman and love interest of one of the main cast. Additionally, she appeared in two episodes of its spinoff series, Shoresy.

In August 2018, Canadian media company, Corus Entertainment announced that Cloutier would be the host of its upcoming reality TV fashion design competition series Stitched, which premiered in September 2018.

Agencies 
 Next Models Canada (mother agent)
 Ford Models in New York and Paris
 NEXT Model Management in Milan
 Premier Model Management in London
 Mega in Germany
 View in Barcelona

References

External links 
 
 Kim Cloutier on www.nextmodels.ca
 Kim Cloutier on www.fordmodelseurope.com
 See Kim Cloutier at: Fashion Model Directory, supermodels.nl
 Kim Cloutier at the Sports Illustrated Swimsuit Issue

Living people
1987 births
French Quebecers
Female models from Quebec
Models from Montreal